More than one species shares the common name "brown shrimp":
Crangon crangon, a species found in the north-eastern Atlantic Ocean and North Sea
Farfantepenaeus aztecus (formerly Penaeus aztecus), a species found in the north-western Atlantic Ocean and Gulf of Mexico
Farfantepenaeus subtilis (formerly Penaeus subtilis), a species found in the south-western Atlantic Ocean as far north as Cuba
Metapenaeus monoceros (formerly Penaeus monoceros), an Indo-Pacific species and Lessepsian migrant

Animal common name disambiguation pages